Jack Kirkland (July 25, 1902 – February 22, 1969) was an American playwright, producer, director and screenwriter.

Kirkland's greatest success was the play Tobacco Road, adapted from the Erskine Caldwell novel.   His other plays included Frankie and Johnny, Tortilla Flat, Suds in your Eye, Mr. Adam, Man with the Golden Arm, and Mandingo.

Kirkland collaborated with Melville Baker on several screen projects including Zoo in Budapest (1933) starring Loretta Young and Gene Raymond, Now and Forever (1934) starring Gary Cooper, Carole Lombard and Shirley Temple, and The Gilded Lily (1935) starring Claudette Colbert, Fred MacMurray and Ray Milland.

Jack Kirkland was married several times, including a marriage to actress and producer, Haila Stoddard, and he had several children with several wives, one of whom was the ballerina Gelsey Kirkland.

References

External links

Image of Jack Kirkland and actress Betty Douglas, Beverly Hills, California, 1937. Los Angeles Times Photographic Archive (Collection 1429). UCLA Library Special Collections, Charles E. Young Research Library, University of California, Los Angeles.

1902 births
1969 deaths
Writers from St. Louis
American male screenwriters
20th-century American dramatists and playwrights
American male dramatists and playwrights
20th-century American male writers
Screenwriters from Missouri
20th-century American screenwriters